Ana Pouvreau  is a French political scientist, writer and  specialist in International Relations and
Strategic studies. Originally a Russia specialist for 15 years, she has
become a Turkish affairs specialist.

and has worked on other geopolitical areas such
as the Balkans. She
is also an expert on the politics, defence and security issues of France.
In recent years, she has been investigating societal issues which she considers
critical to the survival of Western civilization. She is the author of
several books and has also written for Newsweek

and other publications.

Pouvreau obtained a B.A in Political Science and Russian at the State University of New York at Stony Brook in 1988 and a M.A in International Relations and Strategic Studies from Boston University in 1991. She also holds a master's degree from the University of Paris X-Nanterre in Russian language and civilization and a diplôme d’études approfondies in Slavic studies from the University of Paris IV-Sorbonne. In 1995, she obtained her PhD from the Sorbonne summa cum laude in Slavic Studies. Her doctoral thesis focused on the attempts of moral rejuvenation in post-Soviet Russian society by former dissident Christian anti-Soviet movements.

Two of the great intellectual influences on her work are Alexander Solzhenitsyn and Alexander Zinoviev. Pouvreau speaks English, French,
Russian and she has a basic knowledge of Turkish, Spanish and Italian.

Publications 
 
 
  (Editor and co-author)

References

External links 

 Ana Pouvreau ana-pouvreau.com

1967 births
Writers from New York City
Political scandals
Living people